DRW Holdings, LLC, typically referred to as DRW, is a diversified trading firm innovating across traditional and emerging markets. The firm is based in Chicago. The firm was founded in 1992 by Don Wilson, an options trader at the Chicago Mercantile Exchange, and was named after his initials: DRW. The firm trades various financial instruments, including fixed income, options and derivatives, energy and agriculture, and cryptocurrency. DRW has offices in Amsterdam, Austin, Greenwich, Tel Aviv, Chicago, New York City, Houston, London, Montreal, and Singapore. DRW is one of the five largest trading firms in the world.

History 
DRW was founded in 1992 by Don Wilson, an options trader at the Chicago Mercantile Exchange, and was named after his initials: DRW. The firm utilizes a variety of different strategies, including high-frequency trading, and was a notable subject in Michael Lewis's 2014 book Flash Boys, which describes how several trading firms compete with each other to purchase and establish infrastructure that allows trading advantages at the sub-nanosecond level (latency arbitrage).

The firm has been the subject of at least one lawsuit by financial regulators. The Commodity Futures Trading Commission, or CFTC, sued Wilson in November 2013 for alleged market manipulation in interest-rate swap futures during 2010 and 2011. The case was dismissed in December 2018 after the court found no evidence of market manipulation by DRW.

DRW has engaged in the acquisition of several other trading firms and asset portfolios. In 2008, during the collapse of investment bank Lehman Brothers, DRW purchased Lehman's foreign exchange, interest-rate derivatives, and agricultural derivatives portfolios in a fire sale auction. In 2015, DRW acquired proprietary trading firm Chopper Trading. In August 2017, Reuters reported that DRW had acquired high-frequency trading firm RGM Advisors. Later, in November 2017, DRW established an energy trading group in Houston from Martin Energy Trading.

DRW has also been active in the cryptocurrency and blockchain space. In 2018, DRW backed Eris Exchange, a cryptocurrency market that allows trading various cryptocurrencies such as Bitcoin, Ethereum, and Bitcoin Cash. Digital Asset Holdings, which is creating a "blockchain database", was spun out of a Bitcoin trading operation at DRW.

References 

Companies based in Chicago
1992 establishments in Illinois
Financial services companies based in Illinois
American companies established in 1992